Cyrtopodion is a genus of lizards in the family Gekkonidae (geckos). The genus has 24 described species.

Species
Species in the genus Cyrtopodion are:
Cyrtopodion agamuroides  
Cyrtopodion aravallensis  – Delhi rock gecko
Cyrtopodion baigii 
Cyrtopodion belaense 
Cyrtopodion brevipes 
Cyrtopodion fortmunroi  
Cyrtopodion gastrophole  – Werner's bent-toed gecko 
Cyrtopodion golubevi 
Cyrtopodion hormozganum 
Cyrtopodion indusoani 
Cyrtopodion kachhense 
Cyrtopodion kiabii  
Cyrtopodion kirmanense 
Cyrtopodion kohsulaimanai 
Cyrtopodion mansarulum  – Jammu bent-toed gecko
Cyrtopodion medogense 
Cyrtopodion montiumsalsorum 
Cyrtopodion persepolense 
Cyrtopodion potoharense  
Cyrtopodion rhodocaudum 
Cyrtopodion rohtasfortai 
Cyrtopodion scabrum 
Cyrtopodion sistanense 
Cyrtopodion watsoni 

Nota bene: A binomial authority in parentheses indicates that the species was originally described in a different genus.

References

Further reading
Fitzinger L (1843). Systema Reptilium, Fasciculus Primus, Amblyglossae. Vienna: Braumüller & Seidel. 106 pp. + indices. (Cyrtopodion, new genus, p. 93). (in Latin).

External links

 
Lizard genera
Taxa named by Leopold Fitzinger